Bahramabad (also Romanized as Bahrāmābād) is a village in Tombi Golgir Rural District, Golgir District, Masjed Soleyman County, Khuzestan Province, Iran. At the 2006 census, its population was 58, in 15 families.

References 

Populated places in Masjed Soleyman County